The FIBA Intercontinental Cup (formerly the FIBA Club World Cup) is an international basketball competition that is organised by FIBA, the sport's global governing body. Currently, four teams qualify for each season, the winners of the Basketball Africa League (BAL), Basketball Champions League, Basketball Champions League Americas, NBA G League and the FIBA Asia Champions Cup (from 2024).    

From to 1970 to 1980, there were no finals played as the league champions were decided through a league format, in which all teams played each other once and were ranked based on wins. The Intercontinental Cup was not organised between 1998 and 1995, and 1997 and 2012 as well.    

Real Madrid holds the record for most championships, with five, with two of them coming after a direct confrontation in a final. Spain has been the most successful country with nine titles distributed among clubs from the country. Teams representing Europe have been most successful, winning 33 titles in total.    

The current champions are Canarias (known as Lenovo Tenerife for sponsorship reasons), who beat São Paulo in the 2023 final.

List of finals

Results

Performance by head coach 
Lolo Sainz holds the record for most Intercontinental Cup titles won by a head coach, with four titles won with Real Madrid. He is followed by Hank Vaughn, who managed the Akron Goodyear Wingfoots during their three consecutive championships from 1967 to 1969.

Notes

References 

Finals
Intercontinental Cup, FIBA